Acacia fragilis is a shrub of the genus Acacia and the subgenus Plurinerves that is endemic to south western Australia.

Description
Like most species of Acacia it phyllodes instead of true leaves. It blooms from July to October and produces yellow flowers.

Taxonomy
The species was first formally described by the botanists Joseph Maiden and William Blakely in 1927 as part of the work Descriptions of fifty new species and six varieties of western and northern Australian Acacias, and notes on four other species as published in the Journal of the Royal Society of Western Australia. It was reclassified as Racosperma fragile by Leslie Pedley in 2003 then transferred back to genus Acacia in 2006.

Distribution
It is native to an area in the Wheatbelt and Goldfields regions of Western Australia where it is commonly situated on low ridges and rises or on sand plains growing in rocky, sandy or loamy soils often over or around areas of laterite. The range of the plant extends from around Carnamah in the north west to around Cunerdin and Merredin in the south east where it considered to be reasonably common. Other populations are found around Holt Rock, near Boondi and along and on Ponton Creek near Zanthus in the east and is usually a part of scrubland composed of mallee Eucalyptus and other Acacia species.

See also
 List of Acacia species

References

fragilis
Acacias of Western Australia
Taxa named by Joseph Maiden
Taxa named by William Blakely
Plants described in 1927